The second USS Cossack (SP-695) was an armed motorboat that served in the United States Navy as a patrol vessel from 1917 to 1919.

Construction, acquisition, and commissioning
Cossack was built as a civilian motorboat of the same name in 1916 by George Lawley & Son of Neponset, Massachusetts. Upon the entry of the United States into World War I, the U.S. Navy acquired her in April 1917 for war service as a patrol boat. She was commissioned as USS Cossack (SP-695) at Boston on 1 May 1917.

Service history

World War I
Assigned to the 1st Naval District, Cossack conducted patrols in the Boston, Massachusetts, until October 1918.

Due to an urgent need for craft such as Cossack at Brest, France, an order dated 14 October 1918 went out from Washington, D.C., to Boston, directing the Commandant of the 1st Naval District to ready six section patrol boats -- USS Commodore (SP-1425), Cossack, USS War Bug (SP-1795), USS Sea Hawk (SP-2365), USS Kangaroo (SP-1284), and USS SP-729—to be shipped to France as deck cargo along with spare parts to keep them operational. However, this proposed movement appears to have been cancelled, probably because of the armistice with Germany of 11 November 1918 that ended World War I and eliminated the need for more U.S. Navy patrol craft in Europe.

Instead, Cossack was reassigned to the 3rd Naval District in October 1918, probably for patrol service in the New York City area.

Decommissioning and disposal
Cossack was stricken from the Navy List on 27 March 1919. She was turned over to the United States Coast Guard on 22 November 1919.

United States Coast Guard service
As USCGC Cossack, she was stationed at Tampa, Florida. Renamed USCGC AB-3 in November 1923, she was destroyed by fire on 9 May 1925.

Notes

References
 for Cossack
 for SP-729 (ex-Apache)
Department of the Navy: Naval Historical Center: Online Library of Selected Images: U.S. Navy Ships: USS Cossack (SP-695), 1917-1919. Originally the Civilian Motor Boat Cossack (1916)
NavSource Online: Section Patrol Craft Photo Archive USCGC Cossack (AB 3) ex-USCGC Cossack ex-USS Cossack (SP 695)

Patrol vessels of the United States Navy
World War I patrol vessels of the United States
Ships built in Boston
1916 ships
Ship fires
Maritime incidents in 1925